Jacques Maumont (29 September 1924 – 13 April 2006) was a French sound editor who won at the 35th Academy Awards in the category of Best Special Effects. He won for his work on the film The Longest Day, for which he shared his win with Robert MacDonald. He worked on 140 films during his career.

References

External links

1924 births
2006 deaths
Best Visual Effects Academy Award winners
Sound editors
César Award winners